Santana, short form for Santa Ana (meaning Saint Anne) is a municipality along the northern coast of the island of Madeira, in the Portuguese archipelago of the same name.

Geography

Santana includes six parishes, within a rugged mountainous environment, most occupying river-valleys:
 Arco de São Jorge
 Faial
 Ilha
 Santana - the parish (and town) has a population of 3,275 (in 2011), in an area of 19.01 km² 
 São Jorge
 São Roque do Faial

Santana parish has the largest number residents, while Arco de São Jorge is both the smallest, physically, and has the lowest number of residents, while Faial is the largest parish.

Santana is known for the traditional homes constructed with sloping triangular rooftops, and protected with straw.  These were mainly rural homes, used by local farmers, during the settlement of the island, with white-painted walls, red doors and windows with blue trim. Most of the surviving buildings are tourist attractions, and maintained (for example, the straw roofs are replaced every four to five years).

Economy
This includes exhibits on the island's history, artifacts used in daily life and cultural presentations, in a scenic environment.

Notable citizens
 Teodósio de Gouveia (1889 in São Jorge - 1962 in Lourenço Marques) - Roman Catholic Cardinal for Lourenço Marques, and first resident Cardinal in Africa.

References

Towns in Portugal
Madeira Island
Municipalities of Madeira